Leonard Hyman Tose (March 6, 1915 – April 15, 2003) was an owner of the Philadelphia Eagles from 1969 to 1985. He made a fortune in the trucking industry and was known for his lavish lifestyle but he eventually lost it all due to a gambling addiction and alcoholism.

Early years
Tose's father, a Russian Jewish immigrant to the United States, settled outside Philadelphia and was a peddler with a pack on his back. He eventually owned 10 trucks, the beginning of the family business. Eventually, Tose Inc. owned more than 700 trucks and grossed $20 million a year. Tose was born in Bridgeport, Pennsylvania and graduated from the University of Notre Dame in 1937.

Philadelphia Eagles owner
Tose, a lifelong fan of the Philadelphia Eagles, invested in the team as a member of the "Happy Hundred," a group led by James P. Clark. Tose invested $3,000 as one of the one hundred owners to purchase the team from Alexis Thompson on January 15, 1949. Tose tried to buy the team with his own group of investors in 1956, but was unable to do so. The team was bought in December 1963 by Jerry Wolman for $5,505,000 and Tose received more than $60,000. He bought the team from Wolman in 1969 for $16,155,000, then a record for a professional sports franchise.  Tose's first official act was to fire head coach Joe Kuharich.  He followed this by naming former Eagles receiving great Pete Retzlaff as general manager and Jerry Williams as coach.

In 1976, he, along with General Manager Jimmy Murray, lured Dick Vermeil from UCLA to coach the hapless Eagles, who had one winning season from 1962 to 1975. Vermeil's 1980 team lost to Oakland in the Super Bowl. 

The 1982 NFL strike cost the Eagles revenue from seven games and placed the team, which was already in debt, in a difficult financial situation. Shortly after the season ended, Tose's daughter, Susan Tose Fletcher, took over the day-to-day operations of the team from Murray. In 1985, after attempts to move the franchise to Phoenix, Arizona and/or trade franchises with Buffalo Bills owner Ralph Wilson failed, Tose was forced to sell the Eagles to Florida automobile dealers Norman Braman and Ed Leibowitz for a reported $65 million to pay off his more than $25 million in gambling debts at Atlantic City casinos.

After the Eagles 
In 1991, the Sands sued Tose for $1.23 million in gambling debts. He countersued, contending that the casino got him too drunk to know what he was doing. Eventually, the casino won.  There was testimony from a cocktail waitress swearing that her job description was "to keep Mr. Tose's glass filled." The casino provided a monogrammed glass which she was instructed to keep filled with top-shelf scotch.

In the end, Tose lost by his estimate more than $20 million at Resorts International and $14 million at the Sands. In 1996, on his 81st birthday, Tose was evicted from his seven-bedroom Villanova mansion after losing the house in a U.S. Marshal's sale.

In 1999, Tose told a congressional hearing on compulsive gambling that his losses totaled between $40 and $50 million. He spent his last years alone in a downtown hotel room after his home in Philadelphia's upscale Main Line district was confiscated for unpaid taxes. Tose died in his sleep in the hospice wing of St. Agnes Medical Center in Philadelphia on April 15, 2003. He was 88. No cause of death was released. An obituary by Dan Dunkin captured his life: "To put Leonard Tose's life in football terms, he threw on every down."

Personal life
Tose had been married five times. His first wife was Jayne Ester Orenstein, who was also Jewish.  They had two daughters, Nan Tose Schwartz and Susan Tose Fletcher. His second wife was Andrea Tose and  they divorced in 1981. In 1981, he married his third wife, former stewardess Caroline Collum, who used to be in charge of the Eagle cheerleaders: the Liberty Belles.  They divorced and she then married I.G. "Jack" Davis, the former president of Resorts International Casino Hotel; and later she married Sidney Kimmel, the founder of the Jones Apparel Group. His fourth wife was Julia Farber of Cherry Hill, New Jersey.

Tose was, by his own admission, a compulsive gambler and an alcoholic with a lifestyle others called flamboyant and he called comfortable. He and the fourth of his five wives had matching Rolls-Royces. Tose flew to Eagles home games in a helicopter, was married aboard the liner Queen Elizabeth 2 and fed reporters filet mignon and shrimp cocktail.

During his tenure as Eagles owner, Tose was instrumental in helping establish the first Ronald McDonald House. Together with General Manager Jim Murray and Eagles player Fred Hill (whose daughter had leukemia), Dr. Audrey Evans and McDonald's regional manager Ed Rensi, a house was established for families to stay when their children received treatment for pediatric cancers. The house was financed by proceeds from sales of Shamrock Shakes throughout the Philadelphia area.

See also
 History of the Philadelphia Eagles

References

Further reading
 Pokerjokers.co.uk
 Saint Petersburg Times
 Jewish Bulletin
 philyBurbs.com

1915 births
2003 deaths
People from Bridgeport, Pennsylvania
Philadelphia Eagles owners
20th-century American businesspeople
Jewish American sportspeople
American people of Russian-Jewish descent
University of Notre Dame alumni
United States Army soldiers
Jewish American military personnel
20th-century American Jews
21st-century American Jews